Büyükçekmece Basketbol, mostly known as ONVO Büyükçekmece for sponsorship reasons, is a Turkish professional basketball club based in Büyükçekmece, Istanbul which plays in the Turkish Basketball Super League. Their home arena is Gazanfer Bilge Sports Hall with a capacity of 3,000 seats.

History
Tüyap Büyükçekmece was founded in 2011, in Büyükçekmece. The team began playing in the TB3L for 2011-12 season. In 2012-13 season, the team promoted to TB2L as a champion. In their first season in TB2L the team finished ninth and they completed the league. In the 2014–15 season, the team finished fourth of regular season. The team beat Akhisar Belediye in quarter-final. Then the team beat Denizli Basket in semi-final and Tüyap Büyükçekmece reached the TB2L Final. The Final was lost to Yeşilgiresun Belediye, but Tüyap was still promoted to the highest tier.

Logos

Season by season

 Cancelled due to the COVID-19 pandemic in Europe.

Players

Current roster

Depth chart

Notable players

 Jerry Johnson

References

External links 
 Büyükçekmece Basketbol Twitter, Official Twitter Account
 Demir Inşaat Büyükçekmece Basketball, Eurobasket profile
 TBLStat.net Profile

Basketball teams in Turkey
Basketball teams established in 2011
Sport in Istanbul
Sports teams in Istanbul